The 858th Radar Squadron is an inactive United States Air Force unit. It was last assigned to the 26th Air Division, Aerospace Defense Command, stationed at Fallon Air Force Station (Naval Air Station Fallon), Nevada. It was inactivated on 30 June 1975.

The unit was a General Surveillance Radar squadron providing for the air defense of the United States.

Lineage
 Established as the 858th Aircraft Control and Warning Squadron
 Activated on 8 October 1955
 Redesignated 858th Radar Squadron (SAGE) on 1 December 1962
 Inactivated on 1 March 1970
 Redesignated 858th Radar Squadron on 1 January 1974
 Activated on 17 January 1974
 Inactivated on 30 June 1975

Assignments
 28th Air Division, 8 October 1955
 San Francisco Air Defense Sector, 1 July 1960
 Reno Air Defense Sector, 15 September 1960
 26th Air Division, 1 April 1966
 27th Air Division, 15 September 1969
 26th Air Division, 19 November 1969 - 1 March 1970
 26th Air Division, 17 January 1974 - 30 June 1975

Stations
 Hamilton AFB, California, 8 October 1955
 Fallon AFS (NAS Fallon), Nevada, 1 January 1956 - 1 March 1970
 Fallon AFS (NAS Fallon), Nevada, 17 January 1974 - 30 June 1975

References

 Cornett, Lloyd H. and Johnson, Mildred W., A Handbook of Aerospace Defense Organization  1946 - 1980,  Office of History, Aerospace Defense Center, Peterson AFB, CO (1980).
 Winkler, David F. & Webster, Julie L., Searching the Skies, The Legacy of the United States Cold War Defense Radar Program,  US Army Construction Engineering Research Laboratories, Champaign, IL (1997).

External links

Radar squadrons of the United States Air Force
Aerospace Defense Command units